Mac Swinford (December 23, 1899 – February 3, 1975) was a United States district judge of the United States District Court for the Eastern District of Kentucky and the United States District Court for the Western District of Kentucky.

Education and career

Born in Cynthiana, Kentucky, Swinford attended the University of Virginia and read law in 1922, then graduated from the University of Virginia School of Law in 1925. He was in private practice in Cynthiana from 1922 to 1933. He was a member of the Kentucky House of Representatives from 1926 to 1929, and was then the United States Attorney for the Eastern District of Kentucky from 1933 to 1937.

Federal judicial service

Swinford was nominated by President Franklin D. Roosevelt on August 19, 1937, to the United States District Court for the Eastern District of Kentucky and the United States District Court for the Western District of Kentucky, to a new joint seat authorized by 49 Stat. 1806. He was confirmed by the United States Senate on August 20, 1937, and received his commission on August 21, 1937. He served as Chief Judge of the Eastern District from 1963 to 1969. He was a member of the Judicial Conference of the United States from 1966 to 1969. His service terminated on February 3, 1975, due to his death.

References

Sources
 

1899 births
1975 deaths
People from Cynthiana, Kentucky
Members of the Kentucky House of Representatives
United States Attorneys for the Eastern District of Kentucky
Judges of the United States District Court for the Western District of Kentucky
Judges of the United States District Court for the Eastern District of Kentucky
United States district court judges appointed by Franklin D. Roosevelt
20th-century American judges
United States federal judges admitted to the practice of law by reading law